Calamotropha aeneiciliellus is a moth in the family Crambidae. It was described by Joseph de Joannis in 1930. It is found in Vietnam.

References

Crambinae
Moths described in 1930